Kurdeh or Kavardeh may refer to:
 Kurdeh, Khonj, Fars Province
 Kurdeh, Larestan, Fars Province
 Kurdeh, Razavi Khorasan